It Always Rains on Sunday is a 1947 British film adaptation of Arthur La Bern's novel by the same name, directed by Robert Hamer. The film has been compared with the poetic realism movement in the French cinema of a few years earlier by the British writers Robert Murphy and Graham Fuller.

Synopsis
The film concerns events one Sunday (23 March 1947, according to the announcement blackboard at the local underground station) in Bethnal Green, a part of the East End of London that had suffered the effects of bombing and post-war deprivation. Rose Sandigate is a former barmaid married to a middle-aged man who has two teenage daughters from a previous marriage. She is now housewife, but with her wounded heart and kindly husband is coping with the difficulties of rationing and a drab, joyless environment. A former lover, Tommy Swann, jailed four years earlier for robbery with violence, escapes from prison and in a newspaper report is, as Rose discovers, on the run. In a remarkable series of flashbacks, the movie indicates that Rose must be still in love with Tommy Swann (they were engaged, but he jilted her), and he may well be the father of her young son. Tommy appears, hiding in the family's air-raid shelter. He asks her to hide him until nightfall. Rose initially refuses, but clearly still in love with him, eventually allows him to hide in the bedroom she shares with her husband, after the other members of the household have gone out. She then keeps the bedroom locked.

It proves extremely difficult to keep the presence of the escapee a secret in such a busy, bustling household. It is Sunday morning, the lunch must be cooked, the girls admonished for their misdemeanours of the previous night, and the husband packed off to the pub out of the way. Tommy needs money, and in a sad moment she gives him a jewelled ring she has been hiding. Tommy is pleased, because he can sell it well and says ‘Where'd you get it?’. She says flatly "It was given". He says nothing in response. (It was the ring he had given to her earlier in the film.) The strain of concealment is intolerable, and as the day progresses, the police net closes, and a newspaper reporter interrupts them as Tommy is about to flee, and soon tips off the police. By nightfall, her secret is out, and a panic-stricken Rose tries to gas herself. The prisoner is cornered in railway sidings and arrested by the detective inspector (Jack Warner) who has been patiently tracking him. As the film ends, Rose is in hospital recovering, reconciling with her husband, who then returns alone to their home under a clear sky.

Main cast

Googie Withers as Rose Sandigate
Edward Chapman as George Sandigate
Susan Shaw as Vi Sandigate
Patricia Plunkett as Doris Sandigate
David Lines as Alfie Sandigate
Sydney Tafler as Morry Hyams
Betty Ann Davies as Sadie Hyams, Morry's wife 
John Slater as Lou Hyams, Morry's brother
Jane Hylton as Bessie Hyams, Morry's sister
Meier Tzelniker as Solly Hyams, Morry's father
John McCallum as Tommy Swann
Jimmy Hanley as Whitey
John Carol as Freddie
Alfie Bass as Dicey Perkins
Jack Warner as Detective Sergeant Fothergill
Frederick Piper as Detective Sergeant Leech
Michael Howard as Slopey Collins
Hermione Baddeley as Doss-house keeper
Nigel Stock as Ted Edwards
John Salew as Caleb Neesley
Gladys Henson as Mrs Neesley
Edie Martin as Mrs Watson
Vida Hope as Mrs Wallis
Arthur Hambling as Yardmaster
Grace Arnold as Landlady

Reception and reputation

Box office
The film was one of the most popular movies at the British box office in 1948. According to Kinematograph Weekly the 'biggest winner' at the box office in 1948 Britain was The Best Years of Our Lives with Spring in Park Lane being the best British film and "runners up" being It Always Rains on Sunday, My Brother Jonathan, Road to Rio, Miranda, An Ideal Husband, Naked City, The Red Shoes, Green Dolphin Street, Forever Amber, Life with Father, The Weaker Sex, Oliver Twist, The Fallen Idol and The Winslow Boy.

Critical
In the decades since its release, the reputation of It Always Rains on Sunday has grown from that of a neatly engrossing slice-of-life drama to a film often cited as one of the most overlooked achievements of late-1940s British cinema. Writing in Films in Review in 1987, William K. Everson described the film as "the definitive British noir", while a series of screenings in New York in 2008 as part of a British Film Noir season elicited tremendous praise from American critics, many of whom were previously unacquainted with the film. Scott Cruddas of The Village Voice described it as "a masterpiece of dead ends and might-have-beens, highly inventive in its use of flashbacks and multiple overlapping narratives, and brilliantly acted by Withers and McCallum". The New York Sun'''s S. James Snyder observed: "When things go from gray to pitch black in the film's final moments, building to a climax that links the anguish of a prison inmate with the daily routine of a working-class wife, (the film) delivers an existential wallop for the ages". David Denby wrote in The New Yorker: "A fascinating noirish look at life in London's East End...the scenes between Withers and McCallum are stunningly erotic", while Stephen Garrett of Time Out summed the film up as: ""Absolutely exhilarating! A bleak thriller realised with utter vibrancy, Robert Hamer's savoury stew of London's lower class roils with an emotional brutality and precision that most films don’t dare attempt, let alone achieve."

The film was given a theatrical re-release in the UK during 2012. Peter Bradshaw reviewing the film in The Guardian commented: "The film is in many ways a precursor to kitchen-sink movies like Saturday Night and Sunday Morning – and that huge, teeming market scene bears comparison with Carné's Les Enfants du Paradis."

References

External links
 
 
 
 
Review of film at Variety''

1947 films
1947 drama films
Film noir
British drama films
British black-and-white films
Films based on British novels
Social realism in film
Films set in London
Ealing Studios films
Films directed by Robert Hamer
Films produced by Michael Balcon
Films scored by Georges Auric
1940s British films